The Embassy of the Republic of Finland in Moscow is the chief diplomatic mission of Finland in the Russian Federation. It is located at 15-17 Kropotkinsky Lane in the Khamovniki District of Moscow.

Ambassadors

Soviet Union

Russia

See also
 Finland–Russia relations
 Diplomatic missions in Russia
 Moscow Finnish School

References

External links
  Embassy of Finland in Moscow

Finland–Russia relations
Finland
Moscow
Khamovniki District
Finland–Soviet Union relations
Cultural heritage monuments in Moscow